Oligotrema is a genus of marine tunicates.

Species
 Oligotrema lyra Monniot C. & Monniot F., 1973
 Oligotrema psammatodes (Sluiter, 1905)
 Oligotrema psammites Bourne, 1903
 Oligotrema sandersi (Monniot C. & Monniot F., 1968)
 Oligotrema unigonas (Monniot C. & Monniot F., 1974)

Species names currently considered to be synonyms:
 Oligotrema arcticus Hartmeyer, 1923: synonym of Asajirus arcticus (Hartmeyer, 1923) 
 Oligotrema indicus (Oka, 1913): synonym of Asajirus indicus (Oka, 1913)

References

Stolidobranchia
Tunicate genera